Paul Friedrich Reinsch (21 March 1836, in Kirchenlamitz – 31 January 1914, in Erlangen) was a German phycologist and paleontologist.

Biography 
He studied natural sciences in Munich and Erlangen, afterwards working as a high school teacher in Erlangen, Zweibrücken and Baselland. Following retirement, he settled in Erlangen as a private scholar.

During his tenure in Baselland, he collected mosses, being inspired by the work of Wilhelm Philippe Schimper and Philipp Bruch. In his scientific travels, he spent two years in North America and considerable time in Cyprus. In the last 20 years of his life, he focused his energy towards research of fossil Foraminifera.

Commemorations 
 Reinschia, a fossilised algae genus described by Charles Eugène Bertrand and Bernard Renault, 1893.
 Reinschiella, algae genus described by Giovanni Battista de Toni, 1889.

Selected works 
 "Algae and Related Subjects: - Collected Works", 1866.
 Die Algenflora Des Mittleren Theiles Von Franken, 1867 – On algae of Middle Franconia.
 "Contributiones ad algologiam et fungologiam", Volume 1, 1874.
 Neue Untersuchungen über die Mikrostruktur der Steinkohle des Carbon, 1881.
 "The Composition and Microscopical Structure of Coal", Victoria Institute (Great Britain).
 "Micro-Palaeophytologia Formationis Carboniferae", 1884.
 Zur Meeresalgenflora von Süd-Georgien, 1890 – On marine algae of South Georgia.

References 

1836 births
1914 deaths
People from Wunsiedel (district)
People from the Kingdom of Bavaria
19th-century German botanists
German phycologists
German paleontologists